The House of Este is a European dynasty of North Italian origin whose members ruled parts of Italy and Germany for many centuries.

The original House of Este's elder branch, which is known as the House of Welf, included dukes of Bavaria and of Brunswick. This branch produced Britain's Hanoverian monarchs, as well as one Emperor of Russia (Ivan VI) and one Holy Roman Emperor (Otto IV).

The original House of Este's younger branch, which is simply called the House of Este, included rulers of Ferrara (1240–1597), and of Modena (–1859) and Reggio (1288–1796). This branch's male line became extinct with the death of Ercole III in 1803.

Origins
According to Edward Gibbon, the family originated from the Roman Attii family, which migrated from Rome to Este to defend Italy against the Ostrogoths. However, there is little evidence to support this hypothesis. The names of the early members of the family indicate that a Frankish origin is much more likely. The Encyclopædia Britannica regards this family as a branch of the Obertenghi. 

The first known member of the house was Margrave Adalbert of Mainz, known only as the father of Oberto I, Count palatine of Italy, who died around 975. Oberto's grandson, Albert Azzo II, Margrave of Milan (996–1097) built a castle at Este, near Padua, and named himself after the location. He had three sons from two marriages, two of whom became the ancestors of the two branches of the family:
 Welf IV, the eldest (d. 1101), was the son of Kunigunde (d. 1056), the last of the Elder Welfs. He inherited the property of his maternal uncle, Welf, Duke of Carinthia, became duke of Bavaria in 1070, and is the ancestor of the elder branch, the House of Welf.
 Hugh, issue of Azzo's second marriage to Garsend of Maine, inherited the French County of Maine, a legacy of his mother's dowry, but sold it one year later and died without heirs.
 Fulco I, Margrave of Milan (d. about 1128/35), the third son, is the ancestor of the younger Italian line of Este.

The two surviving branches, with Duke Henry the Lion of Saxony and Bavaria on the German (Welf dynasty) side, concluded an agreement in 1154 which allocated the family's Italian possessions to the younger line, the Fulc-Este, who in the course of time acquired Ferrara, Modena and Reggio. Este itself was taken over in 1275 by Padua, and in 1405 (together with Padua) by Venice.

Elder branch – Electors of Hanover

The elder branch of the original House of Este, known as the House of Welf (historically rendered as "Guelf" or "Guelph" in English), produced dukes of Bavaria (1070–1139, 1156–1180), dukes of Saxony (1138–1139, 1142–1180), a German King (1198–1218), and the dukes of Brunswick and Lüneburg (1208–1918) (later styled the "Electors of Hanover") when the two branches of the family recombined in 1705. The House of Welf gave Great Britain and the United Kingdom the "Hanoverian monarchs" (1714–1901).

The senior branch of the House of Welf continued to be ruled by the princes of Brunswick-Wolfenbüttel, as undisputed until the death of the ruling duke of Brunswick Prince William VIII, in 1884. Prior to his death, his brother Karl II from Geneva Switzerland, as exiled de jure ruler of the house, had declared the Prussian annexation of the crown and the earlier Hanoverian usurpation absolutely illegal acts of usurpation inside of the German House. At his death, his grandson continued internationally recognized appeals. Hanover formed the Guelph Party (or German Party) to continue political appeals against the Prussian and German annexations of the crown.

After the peace ending the Napoleonic Wars reshaped Europe, ushering in the modern era, the Electorate of Hanover (duchy of Brunswick and Lüneburg, held in personal union by the king of Great Britain, George III) was dissolved by treaty. Its lands were enlarged and the state was promoted to a kingdom. The new kingdom existed from 1815 to 1866, but upon the accession of Queen Victoria (who could not inherit Hanover under Salic law) in 1837, it passed to her uncle, Ernest Augustus, King of Hanover, and thus ceased to be in personal union with the British Crown.

Younger branch – Margraves of Este

All later generations of the Italian branch are descendants of Fulco d'Este. From 1171 on, his descendants were titled Margraves of Este.

Obizzo I (d. 1193), the first margrave, battled against Emperor Frederick I Barbarossa. His nephew Azzo d'Este VI (1170–1212) became podestà of Mantua and Verona. As the dowry of his niece the Marchesella, Ferrara passed to Azzo VI d'Este In 1146, with the last of the Adelardi. In 1242 Azzo VII Novello was nominated podestà for his lifetime.

The lordship of Ferrara was made hereditary by Obizzo II (d. 1293), who was proclaimed Lord of Ferrara in 1264, Lord of Modena in 1288, and Lord of Reggio in 1289. Ferrara was a papal fief and the Este family were given the position of hereditary papal vicars in 1332.

Ferrara became a significant center of culture under Niccolò d'Este III (1384–1441), who received several popes with great magnificence, especially Eugene IV. He held a Council in Ferrara in 1438, later known as the Council of Florence.

His successors were his illegitimate sons Leonello (1407–1450) and Borso (1413–1471), who was elevated to Duke of Modena and Reggio by Emperor Frederick III in 1452, receiving these duchies as imperial fiefs. In 1471, he received the duchy of Ferrara as papal fief from Pope Paul II, for which occasion splendid frescoes were executed at Palazzo Schifanoia.

Borso was succeeded by a half-brother, Ercole (1431–1505), who was one of the most significant patrons of the arts in late 15th and early 16th century Italy. Ferrara grew into a cultural center renowned especially for music; Josquin des Prez worked for Duke Ercole, Jacob Obrecht came to Ferrara twice, and Antoine Brumel served as principal musician from 1505. Ercole's daughter Beatrice (1475–1497) married Ludovico Sforza, Duke of Milan; another daughter, Isabella (1474–1539), married Francesco Gonzaga, Marquess of Mantua.

Ercole I's successor was his son Alfonso I (1476–1534), third husband of Lucrezia Borgia, daughter of Pope Alexander VI, sister to Cesare Borgia. Alfonso I was a patron of Ariosto.

The son of Alfonso and Lucrezia Borgia, Ercole d'Este II (1508–1559), married Renée of France, daughter of Louis XII of France. His son Alfonso II first married Lucrezia, daughter of grand-duke Cosimo I of Tuscany. After she died, he married Barbara, the sister of Maximilian II, Holy Roman Emperor (1527–1576). His third wife, Margherita Gonzaga, was daughter of the duke of Mantua.

Alfonso II raised the glory of Ferrara to its highest point, continuing the patron of Torquato Tasso and Giovanni Battista Guarini and in general favoring the arts and sciences, as the princes of his house had always done. The legitimate line ended in 1597 with him; as his heir, Emperor Rudolph II recognized his first cousin Cesare d'Este (1533–1628), member of a cadet branch born out of wedlock, who continued to rule in the imperial duchies and carried on the family name. Ferrara, on the other hand, was annexed by force of arms in 1598 by Pope Clement VIII on grounds of the heir's illegitimacy and incorporated into the Papal States.

The last duke, Ercole III, was deposed in 1796 by the French. His two duchies became the Cispadane Republic, which one year later was merged into the Cisalpine Republic and then into the Napoleonic Kingdom of Italy. Ercole was compensated in 1801 with the small principality of Breisgau in southwestern Germany, whose previous rulers, the Habsburgs, ceded it to him in anticipation of its eventual return to the Habsburgs, since Ercole's daughter Maria Beatrice Ricciarda d'Este was married to a cadet Habsburg, Archduke Ferdinand of Austria-Este. Ercole died in 1803 and Breisgau passed to his daughter and her husband, who in 1806 lost it during the Napoleonic reorganization of the western territories of the defunct Holy Roman Empire to the enlarged and elevated Grand Duchy of Baden.

House of Habsburg-Este

Gallery

See also
 Bradamante and Ruggiero, legendary ancestors of the House of Este
 Duchy of Ferrara
 Duchy of Reggio
 Duchy of Modena and Reggio
 Duchy of Massa and Carrara
 Galleria Estense 
 Ivan VI of Russia
 List of Dukes of Ferrara and of Modena
 List of members of the House of Este

References

Alessandro Cont, "Sono nato principe libero, tale voglio conservarmi”: Francesco II d’Este (1660-1694), “Memorie Scientifiche, Giuridiche, Letterarie”, Accademia Nazionale di Scienze Lettere e Arti di Modena, ser. 8, 12 (2009), 2, pp. 407–459, https://www.academia.edu/6412388/_Sono_nato_principe_libero_tale_voglio_conservarmi_Francesco_II_dEste_1660-1694_

Further reading
 Trevor Dean, Land and Power in Late Medieval Ferrara: The Rule of the Este, 1350–1450.(Cambridge University Press) 1987.

External links
 
 Il Castello Estense: genealogical tree

 
Italian noble families
German noble families
History of Ferrara
History of Modena